Belleview is an unincorporated community in Calhoun County, Illinois, United States. Belleview is located on Illinois Route 96 south of Pleasant Hill.

References

Unincorporated communities in Calhoun County, Illinois
Unincorporated communities in Illinois